Anna Halafoff is an Australian sociologist who is Associate Professor in Sociology at Deakin University and the current president of the Australian Association for the Study of Religion.

Education 
Halafoff completed a Bachelor of Arts at the University of Melbourne, a Master of Letters at the University of New England in 2001, a Graduate Diploma of Education at the University of New England in 2006, and a Doctor of Philosophy at Monash University in Melbourne, Victoria in 2010.

Her doctoral dissertation, titled Netpeace : the multifaith movement and common security, examines the rise of multifaith engagement from the perspective of social movement theory and cosmopolitan theory. Her principal supervisor was Gary Bouma.

Career 
Halafoff is Associate Professor in Sociology of Religion in the School of Humanities and Social Sciences at Deakin University, in Burwood, Australia. She is also a member of the Alfred Deakin Institute's Science and Society Network, Centre for Resilient and Inclusive Societies (CRIS) Consortium, and AVERT (Addressing Violent Extremism and Radicalisation to Terrorism) Research Network.

She is also a Research Associate of the UNESCO Chair in Interreligious and Intercultural Relations – Asia Pacific at Monash University and was a Research Associate of the Religion and Diversity Project at the University of Ottawa.  

Halafoff was a Chief Investigator on two Australian Research Council Discovery Projects on the Worldviews of Generation Z Australians and on Religious Diversity in Australia. She is also the Chief Investigator on the International Research Network for the Study of Science & Belief in Society project on Conspirituality in Australia.

Her research interests include religious diversity, interreligious relations, religion and education, preventing violent extremism, contemporary spirituality, Buddhism and gender, and Buddhism in Australia. She has published extensively in these areas. 

Halafoff's research has had an impact on government policy and curriculum development in the area of religious diversity, particularly in the state of Victoria. She is also regularly called upon to comment on her fields of expertise in the media. She has been a guest on the Australian Broadcasting Corporation's God Forbid and Religion & Ethics programs, and written for The Conversation.

Halafoff is a practicing Buddhist and has been involved in interfaith activities and networks since the mid-1990s.

In 2011, Halafoff was named a United Nations Alliance of Civilizations' Global Expert in the fields of interfaith relations and religion, conflict and peacebuilding. 

She is the current President of the Australian Association for the Study of Religion (AASR). In 2010 the AASR Women's Caucus selected her to give the annual Penny Magee Memorial Lecture.

Halafoff is the Australasian Representative on the International Society for the Sociology of Religion's Council, and Executive Committee member of the International Association for the History of Religions, currently serving as Deputy Secretary General.

Selected publications

Books 
 Singleton, Andrew, Halafoff, Anna, Rasmussen, Mary Lou and Bouma, Gary 2021, Freedoms, faiths and futures: Teenage Australians on religion, sexuality and diversity, First ed., Bloomsbury Academic, London. 
 Clarke, Matthew and Halafoff, Anna 2017, Religion and development in the Asia-Pacific : sacred places as development spaces, Routledge, London. 
 Halafoff, Anna, Elisabeth Arweck, and Donald L. Boisvert. 2016. Education about religions and worldviews: promoting intercultural and interreligious understanding in secular societies. Routledge, London. 
Halafoff, Anna 2013, The multifaith movement : global risks and cosmopolitan solutions, Springer, Dordrecht, Netherlands.

Book chapters 
 Halafoff, Anna 2019, InterAction Australia: Countering the Politics of Fear with Netpeace. In John Fahy, and Jan-Jonathan Bock eds., The interfaith movement: Mobilising religious diversity in the 21st century, Routledge, London. pp.68-86. 
Halafoff, Anna 2018. Interfaith Youth in Australia: A Critical Reflection on Religious Diversity, Literacy and Identity. In Lene Kuhle, Jorn Borup and William Hoverd eds., A Critical Analysis of Religious Diversity, Brill. pp. 230–251. 
Halafoff, Anna and Laura Gobey (2018) '"Whatever"? Religion, Youth, and Identity in 21st Century Australia.' In Peter Beyer, Spencer Bulllivant and Paul Gareau eds., Youth, Religion and Identity in a Globalizing Context. Leiden: Brill. pp. 255–277.

Journal articles

References
 

 

 
Living people 
21st-century Australian women scientists
Australian sociologists 
Australian women sociologists 
Sociologists of religion 
University of New England (Australia) alumni 
Monash University alumni 
Academic staff of Deakin University
Year of birth missing (living people)
21st-century Australian women writers